American Ultra is a 2015 American action comedy film directed by Nima Nourizadeh and written by Max Landis. The film stars Jesse Eisenberg, Kristen Stewart, Topher Grace, Connie Britton, Walton Goggins, John Leguizamo, Bill Pullman, and Tony Hale. The story is about a stoner who discovers he was part of a secret government program and is a sleeper agent.

It was released on August 21, 2015, by Lionsgate. The film received mixed reviews from critics, with praise for the premise and cast, but criticism that it "fails to live up to its potential".
The film underperformed at the box office, earning a worldwide total of $30.3 million against a production budget of $28 million.

Plot
Mike Howell is a stoner who lives in the sleepy town of Liman, West Virginia, where he works as a convenience store clerk. He is planning to propose to his longtime girlfriend, Phoebe Larson, on a trip to Hawaii. He is unable to board the plane, as he suffers from intense panic attacks anytime he tries to leave town and does not understand why Phoebe puts up with him.

In Langley, Virginia, CIA Agent Victoria Lasseter receives a coded warning that Mike, the sole survivor of her "Wiseman" Ultra program, is to be eliminated by her rival, Adrian Yates, and his similar "Toughguy" agents. Feeling a duty to protect Mike, Lasseter travels to Liman and "activates" Mike through a series of code words. Mike fails to understand their significance, and she leaves in resigned frustration.

Mike finds two men interfering with his car and is attacked, but his training activates and he kills them using a spoon along with their own weapons. He calls Phoebe, who reaches him just as Sheriff Watts arrives. Yates sends two Toughguy operatives, Laugher and Crane, to kill Mike and Phoebe at the sheriff station, but they evade Laugher and kill Crane before escaping to the home of Mike's drug dealer Rose. Mike becomes unnerved by an array of facts he suddenly knows regarding military strategy. He also realizes he has very little memory prior to living in the town with Phoebe, wondering aloud why he never questioned this before.

Yates quarantines the town, and puts Lasseter and Mike's pictures on the local news. Lasseter convinces her former assistant, Petey Douglas, to air drop her a weapon using a drone. Yates finds out and threatens to charge Petey with treason. Yates then attacks Rose's house with two Toughguys using a lethal gas. The agents kill Rose and his two guards, Big Harold and Quinzin, before Mike and Phoebe kill the attackers and she rescues Mike from the gas, which she is familiar with. When pressed for answers on her knowledge of the gas, Phoebe reluctantly reveals she was a CIA agent assigned to be Mike's handler, leaving him heartbroken.

Laugher ambushes the duo and captures Phoebe. Mike is rescued by Lasseter and insists on returning to his house. She tells him that he volunteered for Wiseman due to his criminal record and subsequently had his memories erased. He also learns that Phoebe was to get him settled in Liman and then leave, but chose to stay because she genuinely fell in love. Lasseter explains that his panic attacks, including his fear of leaving town, were implanted to keep him safe.

Yates' army liaison, Otis, joins a Toughguy to attack Mike's house. Mike and Lasseter kill them, prompting Yates to order a drone strike on the entire block. Petey calls off the drone strike at the last minute and then secretly reports the situation to Yates' superior, Raymond Krueger.

Mike contacts Yates and arranges to exchange himself for Phoebe at a local grocery store. He attacks the store, killing or incapacitating multiple Toughguys before fighting and defeating Laugher, whom he spares when Mike learns that he is a mentally unbalanced man who was forcibly conscripted by Yates. Phoebe escapes from Yates when Lasseter attacks him, but Krueger arrives and stops her.

Phoebe and Mike leave the store under gunpoint of multiple law enforcement officers, as he proposes to her.

In a forested area, Krueger has Yates and Lasseter bound and kneeling. Yates argues that what he was doing would have been okay with Krueger, despite the deaths of innocent people, if the results had been successful, and Krueger agrees. Yates, smugly smiles and stands, but is executed by Krueger for his failure. Krueger admits that he had informed Lasseter of Yates' plan as a courtesy, but he did not expect her to intervene. She points out that, by taking out seventeen Toughguys, Mike is proof of the success of the Wiseman program and a potentially valuable asset.

Six months later, handled by Lasseter and Petey, Mike and Phoebe are in Manila, confident and happy together as they carry out a CIA assignment.

Cast

Production

Writer Max Landis was inspired by a top secret CIA program from the 1950s code named "MKUltra," which conducted experiments on humans to develop superior agents through various mind control techniques. He wondered what it would be like if an ordinary stoner guy had been subjected to the program.

On November 4, 2013, it was announced that Eisenberg and Stewart were on board the project, having previously starred together in the film Adventureland. On March 14, it was announced Goggins had been cast in the film. On April 1, Grace joined the film. On April 14, Pullman and Hale joined the cast. On April 15, it was announced Sharon Stone had been cast in the film; it was later reported Britton would be replacing her.

Filming
Principal photography began on April 14, 2014 in Louisiana near New Orleans and wrapped in mid-June. Filming in Louisiana presented challenges, the production had to deal with snakes, alligators, and torrential rain. Nourizadeh and director of photography Michael Bonvillain emphasized wide shots, and allowed the actors move around the set, with two cameras running to get coverage. The film was shot over a 43 day shooting schedule.
The film received tax incentives for filming in Louisiana, and spent $20.4 million in the state and received $6.55 million in tax incentives.

The film spent a further $3.3 million in post production in New York, and received $0.9 million in tax credits.

Animation
The "Apollo Ape" artwork was created by John Martel, a self-taught artist from Lake Charles, Louisiana. The promotional poster in the style of a comic book cover was done by artist Jim Evans. The end credits animation was made by Gary Leib.<ref>{{cite web |date= 25 August 2015 |author= AMID AMIDI |title= Interview: Gary Leib Talks About Creating 'American Ultras Animation Sequence |url= https://www.cartoonbrew.com/titles/gary-leib-talks-about-creating-american-ultras-animation-sequence-118220.html |website= Cartoon Brew  }}</ref> Leib worked on the animation over six months.

Release
In November 2013, Apsara Distribution announced that they had acquired the rights to distribute the film outside the United States. In March 2014, Lionsgate announced their acquisition of the North American rights to the film, for $7 million. In April 2015, Lionsgate set an August 21 release date for the film.

The first still and two teaser posters were released on May 14, 2015 by MTV. The red band trailer was released by Yahoo! Movies on May 28, 2015. To promote the film at Comic-Con Lionsgate created a website offering free Marijuana to people with existing prescriptions.

The film premiered in Los Angeles, at the Theatre at Ace Hotel.
The film was released on August 21, 2015. It is the first film to be released with a DTS:X soundtrack. According to iSpot.TV, Lionsgate spent $12.6 million on television advertising to promote the film.

Reception

Box officeAmerican Ultra grossed $14,439,985 in North America and $15,855,091 in other territories for a worldwide total of $30,295,076, against a budget of $28 million. Industry estimates predicted opening weekend earnings of $7 to $8 million. In its opening weekend, the film grossed $5.5 million, finishing sixth at the box office and third among the week's new releases, behind Sinister 2 ($10.5 million) and Hitman: Agent 47 ($8.3 million). Straight Outta Compton in its second week retained the number 1 position. 
Landis reacted to the film's poor box office performance in a series of Twitter messages:

In an interview with RedLetterMedia Landis elaborated on his comments, and further discussed the difficulties of making a film not based on existing intellectual property, and what he considered a misleading marketing campaign.

Critical responseAmerican Ultra received mixed reviews from critics. On Rotten Tomatoes, the film has a rating of 43%, based on 176 reviews, with an average rating of 5.40/10. The site's critical consensus reads, "American Ultra has some interesting ideas, but like its stoned protagonist, it's too easily distracted to live up to its true potential." On Metacritic, the film has a score of 50 out of 100, based on 31 critics, indicating "mixed or average reviews". Audiences surveyed by CinemaScore gave the film an average grade of "B−" on an A+ to F scale.

Mark Kermode of The Guardian gave the film two out of five stars, stating "Jesse Eisenberg and Kristen Stewart brave an anarchic mish-mash with lots of violence but few laughs." David Dishman of the McAlester News-Capital writes "American Ultra promoted itself under the slogan, "There is nothing more dangerous than a stoned cold killer," and while they may be right, there's also nothing spectacular about that stoned cold killer's movie."

Peter Travers of Rolling Stone awarded the film two of four stars: "Soon the movie's twisty charm gives way to gory splatter. Eisenberg and Stewart stay appealing to the last. The movie, not so much." Neil Genzlinger from The New York Times gave the film a mixed review, ending with "A lot of it seems familiar, and Mr. Eisenberg and Ms. Stewart aren't stretched much. But Mike finds amusing ways to defend himself using ordinary household items, Walton Goggins and John Leguizamo enliven things in goofy small roles, the plot has a nice twist or two, and your theater is probably air-conditioned." Todd McCarthy of The Hollywood Reporter had mixed opinions of the film, calling it uneven and "A genre mash that's mildly amusing until it can't think of anything else to do besides flop around in the deep end of conspicuous gore." He praises the supporting turns from Leguizamo, and Goggins. McCarthy gives particular praise to the animated end credits. Andrea Barker of Variety welcomed the film, "In a summer film slate awash with reboots, sequels and dutifully box-checking superhero product, it's refreshing to see a genre film made from a completely original screenplay" and praised the "clever ideas, bloody violence so cartoonish that it's almost cuddly, and an eminently likable leading pair" but was critical of the inconsistent tone and didn't feel the end result came together as a whole. Barker concludes, "Only at the end, with completely off-the-wall animated closing credits that embrace the film's latent surreality, do we finally get a glimpse of what 'American Ultra' has been aching to become." Some critics said the marketing was misleading, and 
Neil Gunzlinger of The New York Times'' described it as "a diverting summer action adventure with occasional laughs, not a diverting stoner comedy with occasional action."

Author Stephen King praised the film, saying: "Saw AMERICAN ULTRA last night, and loved it. Fresh and exciting, very cool. Can't figure out why it isn't a smash."

See also
 List of films featuring drones
 Drug-induced amnesia in popular culture

References

External links

 
 
 
 ,

2015 films
2015 action comedy films
2015 comedy films
2010s spy comedy films
American films about cannabis
American films with live action and animation
American action comedy films
American spy comedy films
Drone films
Films about the Central Intelligence Agency
Films about computing
Films about contract killing in the United States
Films about mind control
Films about security and surveillance
Films scored by Marcelo Zarvos
Films set in Langley, Virginia
Films set in West Virginia
Films shot in New Orleans
Films with screenplays by Max Landis
Lionsgate films
Stoner films
Techno-thriller films
2010s English-language films
2010s American films